Rabbit Transit is a 1947 Looney Tunes cartoon, directed by Friz Freleng. The short was released on May 10, 1947, and features Bugs Bunny and Cecil Turtle. The title is a play on "rapid transit".

Cecil and Bugs had previously raced each other in 1941's Tortoise Beats Hare and 1943's Tortoise Wins By a Hare, making this their third and final encounter. Unlike Tortoise Wins by a Hare, this cartoon presumes that Bugs and Cecil have never met before now.

Plot
While relaxing in a steam bath, Bugs reads about the original fable and, as he did reading the credits of Tortoise Beats Hare, becomes incensed at the idea of a turtle outrunning a rabbit. Cecil, also in the steam bath, claims that he could outrun Bugs, but Bugs is still mocking turtles that which Cecil challenges him to a race. This time, Bugs and Cecil agree to no cheating (only after Bugs searches Cecil for roller skates, scooters and other vehicles). Cecil, however, quickly reveals that his shell is now rocket propelled, allowing him to go a surprising combination between fast and slow. Bugs tries to counter Cecil's advantage, first by snagging the shell and trying to dismantle the rockets, then later catching a ride on the shell and dumping water into to choke the engine out. Bugs also tries to set up a false tunnel, but Cecil (in a gag later repeated in Road Runner-Wile E. Coyote cartoons) goes right through it like a regular tunnel. Bugs makes a last desperate dash to the finish line. Cecil is in the lead but notices something and turns off his rockets, letting Bugs beat him. Bugs gloats to Cecil at the finish line that he was "doing 100 easy" in his last dash, and Cecil reveals to Bugs that he did it in a  speed zone. As Bugs is taken away by the police to enjoy his victory—behind bars and insults him, Cecil closes the cartoon by restating one of Bugs's famous catch-phrases: "Ain't I a...um...stinker?"

Home media
VHS- Bugs!
VHS- Bugs Bunny's Zaniest Toons
VHS- Golden Age of Looney Tunes Vol 10: The Art of Bugs
VHS- Looney Tunes Collectors Edition: A Looney Life
Laserdisc- Bugs! And Elmer!
Laserdisc- Golden Age of Looney Tunes Vol. 1
DVD- Looney Tunes Golden Collection Vol. 2
Blu-ray- Looney Tunes Platinum Collection Vol. 2
Streaming- HBO Max

References

External links
 

1947 films
1947 short films
1947 animated films
1940s Warner Bros. animated short films
Looney Tunes shorts
American track and field films
Short films directed by Friz Freleng
Films based on the Tortoise and the Hare
Films scored by Carl Stalling
Bugs Bunny films
Films set on beaches
Films with screenplays by Michael Maltese